Martincourt is a commune in the Meurthe-et-Moselle department in north-eastern France.

Sights and monuments
 Château de Pierrefort - ruined 14th-century castle protected as a monument historique by the French Ministry of Culture

See also 
 Communes of the Meurthe-et-Moselle department
 Parc naturel régional de Lorraine

References

Communes of Meurthe-et-Moselle